Blake is a monologue by Elliott Hayes. It is based on the life of the English poet William Blake and infused with poetry from Blake's Songs of Innocence and Experience. Performances include:
 The Writers' Theater (1996)
 The 1983 Stratford Festival of Canada

Notes

Monologues
Plays based on real people
Plays based on works
1983 plays
Canadian plays